Paracuneus is a genus of sea snails, marine gastropod mollusks in the family Drilliidae.

This genus is placed tentatively in the family Drilliidae.

Species
Species within the genus Paracuneus include:
 Paracuneus immaculatus (Tenison-Woods, 1876)
 Paracuneus kemblensis Laseron, 1954
Species brought into synonymy
 Paracuneus cockae Kilburn, 1977: synonym of Inkinga cockae (Kilburn, 1977)
 Paracuneus platystoma (Smith E. A., 1877): synonym of Inkinga platystoma (E. A. Smith, 1877)
 Paracuneus spadix (Watson, 1886): synonym of Paracuneus immaculatus (Tenison-Woods, 1876)

Distribution
The species in this marine genus are endemic to Australia and occur off New South Wales, Tasmania and Victoria.

References

 Laseron, C. 1954. Revision of the New South Wales Turridae (Mollusca). Australian Zoological Handbook. Sydney : Royal Zoological Society of New South Wales 1-56, pls 1-12.

External links
  Tucker, J.K. 2004 Catalog of recent and fossil turrids (Mollusca: Gastropoda). Zootaxa 682:1-1295

 
Gastropods of Australia
Gastropod genera